Prince of Wales Hospital   may refer to:

Prince of Wales Hospital in Sha Tin, Hong Kong
Prince of Wales Hospital (Sydney) in Sydney, Australia
Prince of Wales Hospital, now David Hare Block, a part of Medical College Kolkata, India
The Prince of Wales Hospital in Tottenham, London, United Kingdom
Government Hospital Periyakulam, Theni district, Tamilnadu initiated by Lord Pentland, Governor of Madras Presidency named this as Prince of Wales hospital in 1916